Ian Crawford (14 July 1934 – 30 November 2007) was a Scottish football player and coach, who most prominently played for Heart of Midlothian in the late 1950s. He scored two goals as Hearts won the 1956 Scottish Cup Final, the club's first Scottish Cup win in 50 years.

Crawford started his senior career with Hearts' Edinburgh derby rivals Hibernian, but did not make a league appearance for the Easter Road club, who enjoyed the services of the Famous Five at the time. After a spell with Hamilton Academical, Crawford joined Hearts in August 1954. He scored 58 goals in 127 league appearances as Hearts won two league championships and the Scottish Cup during his time at the club.

He was transferred to West Ham United for £10,000 in July 1961, where he played alongside Bobby Moore under the management of Ron Greenwood. Crawford later said that it was Greenwood's encouragement that led him to go into coaching, and he served both Everton and Arsenal in that capacity. He also played for both Scunthorpe United and Peterborough United before retiring as a player.

Crawford never played for Scotland at full international level, but did win one cap at under-23 level, scoring against England.

References

External links 
London Hearts profile

1934 births
2007 deaths
Footballers from Edinburgh
Scottish footballers
Scottish football managers
Scottish expatriate football managers
Association football wingers
Hibernian F.C. players
Hamilton Academical F.C. players
Heart of Midlothian F.C. players
West Ham United F.C. players
Scunthorpe United F.C. players
Peterborough United F.C. players
Scottish Football League players
English Football League players
Everton F.C. non-playing staff
Arsenal F.C. non-playing staff
Hamarkameratene managers
Scotland under-23 international footballers